Lily Tomlin is an American actress and entertainer who has had various performances on stage and screen throughout a career spanning almost seven decades since 1965; various of which earned her recognition and honor.

Filmography

Film

Television

Discography

Albums

See also
List of awards and nominations received by Lily Tomlin

References 

Actress filmographies
American filmographies